The 2003 Vuelta a Andalucía was the 49th edition of the Vuelta a Andalucía (Ruta del Sol) cycle race and was held on 16 February to 20 February 2003. The race started in Córdoba and finished in Benalmádena. The race was won by Javier Pascual Llorente.

Teams
Sixteen teams of eight riders started the race:

 
 
 
 
 
 
 Labarca 2–Café Baqué

General classification

References

Vuelta a Andalucia
Vuelta a Andalucía by year
2003 in Spanish sport